The Brixentes or Brixenetes were a Celtic or Rhaetian tribe living in the Alps during the Iron Age and the Roman era.

Name 
They are mentioned as Brixentes (var. ) by Pliny (1st c. AD). An identification with Strabo's Brigántioi (Βριγάντιοι) has been proposed.

The ethnic name Brixentes might derive from an earlier form *brig-s-ant-, built on the root brig- ('hill, hillfort'). It has been translated as 'those living on hills/hillforts', or as 'those living in *Brigsa/Brigsina'.

Geography 
According to the ancient geographer Ptolemy, the Brixentes were a Rhaetian tribe.

It is unclear however where in the Alps the Brixentes actually lived. Since they are listed on the Tropaeum Alpium between the Calucones and the Lepontii, modern-day eastern Switzerland or Vorarlberg seems a possible location, which would further corroborate the corresponding information given by Strabo about the Brigántioi and by Ptolemy about the Brixántai. 

Another theory, inspired by the similarity to the place name, suggests to locate them at the confluence of the Eisack and Rienz rivers in modern-day South Tyrol, near the modern city of Brixen (if reconstructed as *Brigsa/Brigsina).

History 

They are mentioned by Pliny the Elder as one of the Alpine tribes conquered by Rome in 16–15 BC, and whose name was engraved on the Tropaeum Alpium.

References

Primary sources

Bibliography 

Historical Celtic peoples
Gauls